Shin Sung-rok (born November 23, 1982) is a South Korean actor. He frequently appears in films and television series, but is better known an active in musical theatre.

Early life
Shin had initially aspired to become a basketball player together with his brother Je-rok, who is two years younger. Both brothers attended Whimoon High School, known as one of Seoul's top high school basketball programs. An injury prompted Shin to reconsider another career and he transferred to Anyang Arts High School. He majored in Theater and Film at the University of Suwon but subsequently dropped out after being cast in a play.

Career
Shin made his acting debut in 2003, but found it difficult to find acting jobs since directors were reluctant to cast the 189 centimeter-tall aspiring actor in supporting or minor roles. Thinking he would have a better chance if he gained more acting experience and honed his craft on the stage, Shin switched gears and joined the theater company Hakchon.

When Shin performed in his first musical Moskito, there were only 20-25 audience members in the 500-seat hall. Despite feeling depressed and frustrated, he said the experience made him strong and helped him become an actor with plenty of guts.

While doing the musical Dracula, Shin was cast in his first substantial onscreen role, in the risqué cable drama Hyena (2006). Supporting roles in dramas and films followed, notably in Thank You (2007) and My Life's Golden Years (also known as All About My Family, 2008). He also appeared on season 1 of the MBC dating reality show We Got Married as a "fake couple" with female comedian Kim Shin-young.

Mainstream breakthrough still eluded Shin, but in theater his star was rising. In 2007, Shin was picked from 400 auditionees for the lead role Solomon in Dancing Shadows, a musical adaptation of the realist play Forest Fire by celebrated Korean playwright Cha Beom-seok. He later received a Best New Actor nomination from the Korea Musical Awards.

As Shin starred in one hit musical after another, he continued to impress critics with his acting performances, his strong and powerful baritone vocals and his delicate and clear alto notes. He is now considered a top musical star, even drawing fans from outside Korea to his shows.

Definitely Neighbors (2010) further boosted his TV profile; for his role as a difficult chef who falls in love with an older divorcee, Shin won Best Supporting Actor in a Weekend/Daily Drama at the 2010 SBS Drama Awards. His most popular drama yet was the romantic comedy My Love from the Star (2013), in which he appeared as a villainous businessman. This was followed by supporting roles in the 2014 series Trot Lovers (as a talent agency CEO), Liar Game (as the host of a reality show), and The King's Face (as a face reader).

Despite branching out to film and television, Shin has maintained that his heart will always belong to the stage, and has stated, "I feel more affection toward the stage [rather than TV]. I think it is the stage where actors learn life and understand the meaning of acting. It is where I learned how to act and where I gained confidence. I think the core of my life will remain on the stage" (The Korea Herald, 2007). "The musical is like my old home and it made me what I am now, so I can't stop performing the musicals however busy I get" (The Korea Times, 2009)

In September 2021, Shin decided not to renew his contract with HB Entertainment. Later on September 27, 2021, Shin signed a contract with Screening ENT.

Personal life
Shin has a younger brother. Shin Jae-rok is a former professional basketball player who had short stints with Anyang KT&G Kites and Changwon LG Sakers before retiring. He became a chef and has since opened his own restaurant. Both of them appeared on July 30, 2015 KBS talk show Happy Together.

Shin began dating ballerina Kim Joo-won in 2011; Kim was a principal dancer with the Korea National Ballet for 15 years from 1988 to 2003, and currently teaches at Sungshin Women's University. The pair broke up after four years of dating in August 2015.

In June 2016 Shin married a non-celebrity office worker in Hawaii. In November the same year, Shin became a father to a daughter.

Filmography

Television series

Film

Television show

Theater

Awards and nominations

References

External links
 Shin Seong-rok at HB Entertainment 
 Shin Sung-rok Fan Cafe at Daum 
 
 
 

South Korean male film actors
South Korean male television actors
South Korean male musical theatre actors
South Korean male stage actors
1982 births
Living people
People from Seoul
Male actors from Seoul
21st-century South Korean male actors
South Korean baritones